Aksakovo is a rural locality (a village) in Usman-Tashlinsky Selsoviet, Yermekeyevsky District, Bashkortostan, Russia. The population was 22 as of 2010. There is 1 street.

Geography 
Aksakovo is located 29 km north of Yermekeyevo (the district's administrative centre) by road. Usman-Tashly is the nearest rural locality.

References 

48 °F (9 °C), Wind S at 10 mph (16 km/h), 86% Humidity.

Rural localities in Yermekeyevsky District